Saptha smaragditis is a moth in the family Choreutidae. It was described by Edward Meyrick in 1905.

Description

Original Description
Meyrick, 1905. Journal of the Bombay Natural History Society 16: 610-611

Distribution
It is found in Sri Lanka; India; Sulawesi; Myanmar (Burma); Thailand; Borneo and Ambon (Maluku Islands, Indonesia).

Ecology

Larval Host Plant
Unknown.

Habitat
Observations of adult moths from Sri Lanka in 2011 & 2021 were from forest fragments in urban areas. The elevational range is lowland to montane (1500m).

Activity
The adult moths are both diurnal and nocturnal.

Phenology
The known temporal occurrence of each stage of the life cycle across the geographic distribution of S. smaragditis is as follows:

Conservation Status

IUCN Red List
Not evaluated (NE).

References

Choreutidae
Moths described in 1905